Frisco Independent School District is a public school district based in Frisco, Texas, United States. The district covers portions of Denton and Collin counties, including portions of the cities of Frisco, Little Elm, Plano, and McKinney as well as unincorporated land.

The district was originally formed in 1876 and is known as the Farmers School District. Small schoolhouses served the rural population at that time. The community of Frisco began to emerge in 1902 and the school district was renamed.

The district is one of the largest in Texas and the nation. In 1995, Frisco ISD had four schools. Since then, the district has added 71 new schools, opening two to six campuses annually.
No public school district in the country grew faster from 1990–1991 to 2010–2011, according to the National Center for Education Statistics.

The school district is one of the best in the state, receiving the highest Texas Accountability rating of "A".

Board of Trustees 

Frisco ISD Board of Trustees
 René Archambault - President, Place 7
 Debbie Gillespie - Vice President, Place 5
 Dynette Davis - Secretary, Place 4
 Gopal Ponangi - Place 1
 Marvin Lowe - Place 2
 Stephanie Elad - Place 3
 John Classe - Place 6

District Leadership 
Office of the Superintendent

 Dr. Mike Waldrip, EdD - Superintendent of Schools
 Michele Crutcher - Assistant to the Superintendent and Board of Trustees

Administration (Instructional Support Team)

 Todd Fouche - Deputy Superintendent
 Wes Cunningham - Associate Deputy Superintendent
 Pamela Linton - Chief Human Resources Officer
 Cory McClendon - Chief Leadership Officer
 Amanda McCune - Chief Communications Officer
 Cheryl McDonald - Chief Technology Officer
 Erin Miller - Chief Student Services Officer
 Kimberly Smith - Chief Finance and Strategy Officer
 Scott Warstler - Chief Operations Officer

Boundary
The jurisdiction of the Frisco Independent School District spans 2 counties, Collin and Denton, serving 5 cities and unincorporated areas.

Collin County: sections of Frisco, McKinney, and Plano.

Denton County: sections of Frisco, Little Elm, and a parcel of The Colony as well as some unincorporated areas.

Demographics

Schools 
Frisco ISD operates 75 schools: 12 high schools, 17 middle schools, 42 elementary schools, and 3 special program centers. The district opens an average of 1-4 new schools per school year.

References 
https://web.archive.org/web/20120213205839/http://www.schoolstowatch.org/StateProgram/Texas/tabid/396/Default.aspx

External links 

School districts in Collin County, Texas
School districts in Denton County, Texas
School districts established in 1903
1903 establishments in Texas